Airlines Aero was a regional airline based in Tallinn, Estonia. It operated services between three Finnish destinations, as well as international flights to Tallinn. All of their flights were operated under Finnair's designation AY. Its main bases were Helsinki-Vantaa and Tallinn-Lennart Meri. Aero ceased its operations in January 2008.

History 
The name harkens back to Aero Airlines's and Finnair's first incarnation, Aero AS, founded in 1923, and its first Junkers F 13 seaplane took off from Helsinki harbor in Katajanokka to a lake near to the present Ülemiste Airport in Tallinn for its first flight, March 20, 1924, carrying 162 kg (357 lbs) of mail. Other destinations were quickly added: Stockholm and Königsberg, from where passengers took trains respectively to Göteborg (sometimes boarding other planes to Copenhagen, Oslo and London) and to Berlin, and passengers began to queue up at some periods — up to 48 per day in 1926, waiting for the four-seaters to fly them.

After initial reluctance from the Finnish authorities to build airports, Aero's fleet could eventually dispose of its seaplanes and get on wheel-landing aircraft in 1938. But the airlines disappeared as a consequence of the annexion of Estonia by the Soviet Union in June 1940.

Finnair retained Aero AS's IATA designator AY, while the modern-day Aero Airlines flew as EE. The airline was re-established in 2000, and started operations in March 2002, within the Baltic region. It was owned by Aero Holding (51%) and Finnair (49%), was the ownership was later transferred wholly to Finnair. Aero had 128 employees (at March 2007).

Aero scaled down its operations during 2007, and finally flew its last flight on 6 January 2008. All its former routes are now operated by Flybe and Finnair.

The IATA code (EE) and call-sign (REVAL) have been re-used by Nordica, which began operations at the end of 2015.

Destinations 
Aero Airlines operated services to the following scheduled destinations (at December 2007): Helsinki, Tallinn, Turku and Vaasa.

Fleet 

The Aero Airlines fleet consisted of ATR-72-201 airplanes, which were formerly operated by its parent company Finnair. The last two were sold to UTair when Aero ceased its operations.

References

Defunct airlines of Estonia
Airlines established in 2000
Airlines disestablished in 2008
Finnair
2000 disestablishments in Estonia
2008 disestablishments in Estonia
Companies based in Tallinn
Estonian companies established in 2000